Farmer House may refer to:

(sorted by state, then city/town)
Farmer-Goodwin House, Tempe, Arizona, listed on the National Register of Historic Places (NRHP) in Maricopa County
Neville and Helen Farmer Lustron House, Decatur, Georgia, listed on the NRHP in DeKalb County
J.E. Farmer House, Wichita, Kansas, listed on the NRHP in Sedgwick County
Kimball Farmer House, Arlington, Massachusetts, listed on the NRHP in Middlesex County
Farmer House (Carthage, Missouri), listed on the NRHP in Jasper County
Farmer House (Deatonville, Virginia), listed on the NRHP in Amelia County

See also
Farm House (disambiguation)